Princess Wanda (reputedly lived in 8th century Poland) was the daughter of Krakus, legendary founder of Kraków. Upon her father's death, she became queen of the Poles, but committed suicide to avoid an unwanted marriage to a German.

Wanda legend first told by Kadłubek

The first written record of the legend of Wanda was by the Polish chronicler Wincenty Kadłubek. In this version of the story Wanda ruled Poland after the legendary Polish king Krakus. When her lands were invaded by an "Alamann tyrant", who sought to take advantage of the previous ruler's death, Wanda led her troops out to meet him. Seeing her beauty, the German troops refused to fight and their leader committed suicide. Towards the end of the story Kadłubek states that "the river Vandalus is named after" her and hence the people she ruled over were known as "Vandals". In this version Wanda remained unmarried and had a long life.

Later versions of the legend

Subsequent versions of the story differ significantly. In the version from the Wielkopolska Chronicle, the German leader, Rytygier (Rüdiger), first wanted to marry Wanda and invaded her lands only when she refused. Here, he died during the ensuing battle, while it was Wanda who afterward committed suicide, as a thanks and a sacrifice to the pagan gods who gave her victory. In yet other versions of the story, Wanda commits suicide, by throwing herself into the Vistula river, because she knows that as long as she is alive, there will be future potential suitors who will use her refusal to marry as a pretext for an invasion.

Historiography
The story of princess Wanda was first described by medieval (12th and 13th centuries) Polish bishop and historian, Wincenty Kadłubek, and it is assumed by most historians that it was invented by him, possibly based on Slavic myths and legends, although some historians see the legend rooted in Scandinavian or Ancient Roman (or Greek) traditions.

The Kadłubek version has the German prince, not princess Wanda, committing suicide: according to Kadłubek, the princess lived a long and happy life, forever remaining a virgin. It was only in the 13–14th century Wielkopolska Chronicle that the variant with Wanda committing suicide was popularized by the 15th-century historian, Jan Długosz.

Cultural influences
Tradition has it that she is buried in the large Wanda Mound. A custom observed up to the 19th century was that at Pentecost bonfires were lit on this mound, located on the outskirts of Kraków in Nowa Huta, the industrial district established in 1949. Nowa Huta construction begun on the name day of Wanda (23 June), and she is a semi-official patron of that district, which has a trade center, street, bridge and  stadium bearing her name.

The German poet Zacharias Werner wrote a drama named Wanda, which under Werner's friend Goethe was performed on stage in 1809.

In Polish literature, the story of Wanda has served as inspiration of several works, often stressing the themes of Polish independence and victorious conflict with Germany.

The Polish poet C.K. Norwid visited the Mound in 1840. He subsequently composed the narrative poem Wanda in honor of the ancient princess.

The Serbian dramatist Matija Ban made Wanda the symbol of Poland in his 1868 play, Wanda, the Polish Queen.

Antonín Dvořák composed the fifth of his 11 operas, the tragedy Vanda around this episode in Polish history legends. Writing in 1875, he cast the story as a struggle between the pagan Slavs and the Christian Germans.

In 1890, a statue designed by the Polish artist Jan Matejko depicting an eagle turning to the west was mounted on top of the mound. On the base of the statue the inscription WANDA was carved, together with two swords and a distaff.

Scholars Albina Kruszewska and Marion Coleman described Queen Wanda as having "the pure white chastity of Elaine, the filial devotion of Cordelia, and the iron will of Boadicea".

References

Further reading
Anstruther & Sekalski, Old Polish Legends, Hippocrene Books; 2nd edition, May, 1997.
Kraków District Guide, OAG Cities Guides, 2007.
 Cabras, Francesco. 2016. “The Legend of Wanda in Jan Kochanowski’s Elegy I 15”. In: Studi Slavistici 12 (February), 59-77. https://doi.org/10.13128/Studi_Slavis-17969.

External links

Wanda: A Tragic Opera in Five Acts
The Legend of Wanda

Legendary Polish monarchs
Legendary Polish people
Polish princesses
Nobility from Kraków
Queens regnant in Europe
Fiction about suicide
Mythological princesses
Mythological queens
Medieval suicides
8th-century women rulers
8th-century Slavs
Mythological city founders